Ultralife Corporation designs and manufactures batteries and communications systems worldwide. Ultralife serves government and defense, medical, safety and security, energy, robotics and other customers across the globe through the design and development of a range of products. Founded in 1991 when launched as an Initial Public Offering (IPO) evolving from Kodak’s Ultra Technologies battery division, and headquartered in Newark, New York, the Company’s business segments include battery and energy products and communications systems.

Products

Battery and energy products
This segment  manufactures and markets Lithium Manganese Dioxide (Li-MnO2), Lithium Manganese Dioxide Carbon Monofluoride (Li-CFx/MnO2) hybrid and Lithium Thionyl Chloride (Li-SOCl2) non-rechargeable batteries including 9-volt, HiRate cylindrical, ThinCell, and others.  Applications for its 9-volt batteries include smoke alarms, wireless security systems, and intensive care monitors. Its HiRate and ThinCell Lithium non-rechargeable batteries are sold primarily to the military and to OEMs in industrial markets for use in radios, emergency radio beacons, search and rescue transponders, pipeline inspection gauges, portable medical devices and other instruments and applications. Military applications for its non-rechargeable HiRate batteries include manpack and survival radios, night vision devices, targeting devices, chemical agent monitors, and thermal imaging equipment.

Communications systems
Under McDowell Research and AMTI brands, this segment designs and manufactures a line of communications systems and accessories for the military.  All systems are packaged to meet customer needs in rugged enclosures to allow for their use in extreme environments. The segment markets these products to all permitted branches of the U.S. military and foreign defense organizations, as well as U.S. and international defense contractors.

References 

Electronics companies established in 1991
Companies listed on the Nasdaq
Battery manufacturers
1991 establishments in New York (state)